Broiler, formerly known as DJ Broiler, is a Norwegian electronic music record producer and DJ duo made up of Mikkel Buxrud Christiansen (born 22 April 1992) and Simen Auke (born 22 April 1991). In 2011, they found online success with their dance tunes consisting of comical elements, but have since focused on professional remixing and music production.

Music career

Early career
In 2011, Mikkel Christiansen had some success with "Navy Seals" featuring F. Genius. Same year, Simen Auke had major success with his song "Cannabus" under the pseudonym SimenA, who charted on the Norwegian Singles Chart for two weeks.

2012–2013: The Beginning

DJ Broiler released several singles and got famous for their funny videos, which often portrayed and parodied the life in the suburbs and local cities around Drammen. They released "Afterski" in November 2012, which instantly became a hit and charted on the Norwegian Singles Chart, peaking at number 3. In May 2013 they released "Vannski", which reached number one in its third week of charting and became their first number one hit in Norway. "En gang til" was released in June 2013, reaching number 8 on the Norwegian Singles Chart. Their debut studio album The Beginning was released on 4 November 2013, reaching a peak of 6 on the Norwegian Albums Chart. The album also includes the single "Bonski", which reached number 5 on the Norwegian Singles Chart. On 29 November 2013 Broiler released the Episode 1 EP, which peaked at number 19 on the Norwegian Albums Chart. The EP includes the single "Colors", which later reached number 18 on the Norwegian Singles Chart.

Discography

Albums

Extended plays

Singles

Remixes

References

External links
 

Norwegian record producers
Norwegian DJs
Remixers
Living people
Musical groups from Drammen
Tropical house musicians
Electronic dance music DJs
Year of birth missing (living people)